Billy Joe Saunders (born 30 August 1989) is a British professional boxer. He is the first fighter from the Travelling community to win world championships in two weight classes, including the WBO middleweight title from 2015 to 2018 and the WBO super-middleweight title from 2019 to 2021. At regional level he held the European, British, and Commonwealth middleweight titles between 2012 and 2015. Saunders represented Great Britain at the 2008 Olympics as an amateur, reaching the second round of the welterweight bracket. In the same year, he won gold at the EU Championships.

On 19 December 2015, Saunders made history by competing in the first world title fight contested between two members of the travelling community with his opponent Andy Lee; Saunders won the bout by majority decision to become WBO middleweight champion.

Early life
Originally from Cheshunt, Saunders grew up in a Romanichal travelling community near Hatfield, Hertfordshire. His great-grandfather, Absolom Beeney, was one of the community's most famous bare-knuckle boxers.

Amateur career
Saunders fought for Cheshunt Amateur Boxing club and also at Hoddesdon Amateur Boxing Club. Saunders won his first 49 amateur fights at senior level, including the 2007 Commonwealth Championships and the 2008 Strandzha Cup, edging out Cuban Carlos Banteux. In 2008 Saunders qualified for the Beijing Olympics in the welterweight division at the age of 18. At the European area qualifier in Pescara, Italy he beat European champion Andrey Balanov and Kakhaber Zhvania, but lost in the semi-final to Oleksandr Stretskyy before beating Pavol Hlavačka for the all-important third spot.
to become the first person from the British Romanichal community to qualify for the games.

In Beijing he beat Adem Kılıççı in the first round but lost to old foe Carlos Banteux in the second. He was subsequently suspended for "lewd behaviour", allegedly pertaining to an incident with a local woman during a pre-season training camp in France. In early December 2008 Saunders turned professional.

Professional career

Middleweight

Early career
Saunders made his professional debut on 28 February 2009 at the National Indoor Arena in Birmingham, against Attila Molnar. Saunders looked confident from the opening bell, landing hard combinations which quickly overwhelmed Molnar. In round two, a series of punches that landed flush on Molnar's chin caused the referee to stop the fight and save a dazed Molnar. Saunders won his second fight by second-round stoppage of Ronny Gabel and his third fight, also by second round stoppage, of Matt Scriven. On 9 October 2009, he went four full rounds to outpoint Alex Spitko. On 21 May 2011, he scored an impressive second-round knockout victory over Kevin Hammond. Saunders went on to score wins against Norbert Szekeres, Gary Boulden and Tony Hill, the last of these giving him his seventh professional knockout victory and his first major regional title, the Commonwealth middleweight championship, on 28 April 2012. For his first defence of the title, on 1 June, Saunders went the full twelve-round distance (also a first) against veteran Bradley Pryce, outpointing him comfortably. A then-undefeated Jarrod Fletcher was quickly dispatched in two rounds on 14 September.

On 15 December, Saunders fought Nick Blackwell for the vacant British middleweight title. This turned out to be one of Saunders's first tough outings, as he was forced to go the full twelve rounds en route to a competitive unanimous decision victory on the judges' scorecards. A pair of trouble-free fights came next, against tough slugger Matthew Hall on 21 March 2013 and Gary O'Sullivan on 20 July, both of which also lasted twelve full rounds. 2013 concluded for Saunders with another tough fight on 21 September, this time against fellow British prospect John Ryder in defence of the Commonwealth and British middleweight titles. Both fighters came in undefeated and fought for twelve competitive rounds, with very close scorecards all favouring Saunders.

Saunders vs. Blandamura, Eubank Jr.
It would be almost another year until Saunders had his next fight. On 26 July 2014 he added to his title collection with an eighth-round knockout of Emanuele Blandamura, earning him the European middleweight title. Immediately after the Blandamura fight, Saunders called out another undefeated British prospect and archrival Chris Eubank Jr. Prolonged negotiations ensued between Frank Warren and Eubank's team (led by his father Chris Eubank Sr.), with the highly anticipated fight eventually signed in October and taking place on 29 November. All three of Saunders' titles were on the line, as well as being an eliminator for the WBO world middleweight title. The rivalry and build-up was likened to the first fight between Nigel Benn and Chris Eubank in 1990. Saunders went on to defeat Eubank via split decision; two judges had scores of 115–114 and 115–113 for Saunders, with the third judge scoring 116–113 for Eubank. Having secured his third defence of the British middleweight title, Saunders earned the Lonsdale Belt outright; he gave this to his father Tommy as a Christmas present.

Saunders vs. Lee

With the win over Eubank, Saunders was in line for an opportunity to fight WBO world middleweight champion Andy Lee. In February 2015, Saunders and Warren accepted a 'step-aside' financial offer from promoter Lou DiBella in order for Lee to face Peter Quillin instead. Warren said that he hoped for Lee to win that fight so that Saunders vs. Lee could be staged in the summer. At around the same time, due to his high ranking, Saunders also received an offer from the IBF to fight for their vacant world middleweight title, but he reiterated his intention to follow the WBO route. In June, Saunders vs. Lee was officially announced for the WBO world middleweight title. The fight was initially scheduled to take place in Lee's hometown of Limerick on 19 September, but was postponed and moved to Manchester on 10 October due to Lee suffering from a viral infection. On 1 September, yet another postponement arose due to Saunders receiving a cut in sparring. The fight was subsequently rescheduled for 19 December.

On 19 December, Saunders defeated WBO middleweight champion Andy Lee via majority decision to capture his first world title, with judges' scores of 114–112, 115–111, and 113–113. In the third round, Saunders scored two knockdowns against Lee to build up an early lead on the scorecards. He then continued to outbox Lee using head movement and an accurate jab until the later rounds. At this point, Lee began to land more frequently with heavy punches of his own, but was too late to overcome the points deficit despite a strong finish in the final round.

Saunders's first defence of the title was scheduled for 30 April 2016, against Max Bursak at the Copper Box in London. However, Saunders was forced to pull out due to a hand injury sustained in training. "I'm bitterly disappointed. This is boxing and these things happen", he said at the time.

On 8 July, Saunders revealed that he would be fighting on 17 September, likely on the undercard of Canelo Álvarez vs. Liam Smith at AT&T Stadium in Arlington, Texas, which would have been broadcast on HBO pay-per-view in the US. It was rumoured that this would set up a WBO middleweight title defence against Álvarez in December. However, Golden Boy Promotions vice president Eric Gomez told ESPN on 14 August that Saunders would no longer feature on the undercard due to him rejecting all of the opponents presented to him. Opponents supposedly brought forward by Golden Boy were Gabriel Rosado, Curtis Stevens, and Willie Monroe Jr.

Saunders vs. Akavov
Frank Warren finally confirmed Saunders first title defence would be against WBO European middleweight champion Artur Akavov (16–1 7 KOs), ranked by the WBO at number 10. The fight was due to take place at the Motorpoint Arena in Cardiff on 22 October live on BoxNation. The fight card was postponed to 26 November after Saunders suffered a muscle injury, along with his stablemate Liam Williams also suffering an injury during a sparring session. The fight was postponed again to 3 December due to transitional issues with Akavov getting into the UK, the fight then took place at Lagoon Leisure Centre in Paisley, Renfrewshire, Glasgow, Scotland.

Saunders started off slow, showing signs of ring rust. Up until round 5, Akavov was the aggressor and doing enough to take the rounds. In rounds 5, 6, 7 and 8, Saunders bounced back and hit combos landing power shots in the process. This seemed to have tired Saunders out for the last two rounds. The fight went the full 12 rounds. Saunders won on all scorecards claiming a unanimous decision to retain his WBO title. The three judges scored it 116–113, 116–112, and 115–113 in favour of Saunders. Immediately following the announcement, Saunders took the microphone off the MC and thanked the live crowd for coming and harshly criticized himself on his performance, "There was nothing there. I’ve been out a year, a bit overweight. A few adjustments to camp. Just flat, really, really flat. I’d like to apologise to the fans, especially who paid for it. Terrible performance." According to Compubox Stats, Saunders landed 85 punches of 579 thrown (14%), with 51 jabs landed and Akavov landed 81 of his 624 thrown (13%), this included 44 power punches.

On 20 December, it was announced that Saunders had parted with long time trainer Jimmy Tibbs, who he had been mentored by since turning professional in 2008. Rumours had started when Tibbs was not present at Saunders last title defence against Akavov. Instead having Danny Vaughan, Johnney Roye and Ben Davison in his corner. Promoter Frank Warren officially confirmed the news. On 18 January 2017, Saunders announced he would be working with Adam Booth.

Cancelled Avtandil Khurtsidze fight
In early February 2017, mandatory challenger Avtandil Khurtsidze (32-2-2, 21 KOs) took a 'step-a-side' fee to allow Saunders to pursue a bigger fight. On 28 February, it was announced that Khurtsidze would fight undefeated British boxer Tommy Langford for the vacant interim WBO title in April.

After retaining his belts against Jacobs, Gennady Golovkin stated that he wanted to unify the middleweight division and hold all the belts available. Golovkin said, "My goal is all the belts in the middleweight division. Of course, Billy Joe is the last one. It is my dream." Rumours of the fight taking place in Golovkin's home country Kazakhstan in June during the EXPO 2017. The last time Golovkin fought in his home country was in 2010. On 20 March, Golovkin said that he would fight Saunders in his native Kazakhstan or the O2 Arena in London.

Saunders tweeted on social media that although he did not watch Golovkin's fight with Daniel Jacobs, he was ready to fight him. Saunders claimed to have signed the contract on his end and gave Golovkin a deadline to sign his. On 29 March, Frank Warren also stated that Golovkin would have ten days to sign for the fight. Saunders later claimed to have moved on from Golovkin, until Warren said the deal was still in place. Over the next week, Saunders continued to insult Golovkin through social media. On 7 April, Warren told iFL TV, that Golovkin had a hand injury, which was the reason why the fight hadn't been made. In the interview, he said, "At the moment, they’re saying that Golovkin’s injured. So we’re waiting to see where this is all going. But as far as I’m concerned, we agreed [to] terms." It was also noted that he would wait until 6 May, for any updates. On 11 April, it was reported that the fight would not take place and Golovkin would ultimately focus on a September 2017 fight against Canelo Álvarez.

On 22 April 2017, Khurtsidze knocked Langford out in round 5 with a left hook to secure his next fight against Saunders. A day later the fight between Saunders and Khurtsidze was discussed to take place at the Copper Box in London on 8 July 2017.

On 8 June, Khurtsidze was arrested in New York along with 32 others, linking him in a Russian and Georgian crime syndicate. Racketeer charges and conspiracy to commit fraud were the two alleged charges, promoter Lou DiBella said, while the fight would not be completely called off, it would be postponed. Due to the fight being a mandatory defence, Saunders's promoter Frank Warren said that he was unable to make a voluntary defence, as such, taken off the card completely, although the rest of the card would still take place. On 20 June 2017 the WBO released a statement in which it said that the Interim WBO title would be vacated and that Khurtsidze's team would have 10 days to appeal the decision.

Saunders vs. Monroe Jr.
On 14 June 2017, Frank Warren announced that Saunders would likely make his second title defence in September 2017. Names in the running included David Lemieux, Ryota Murata and Rob Brant. The plan was to have Saunders fight around the same week as Golovkin vs. Álvarez, and then fight the winner. The date of Saunders defence was confirmed by Warren, to take place on 16 September.

On 28 June, it was revealed that Saunders had parted ways with trainer Adam Booth, after working together for only six months, and joined Sheffield based trainer Dominic Ingle. Saunders claimed that the reason for the split with Booth was due to being 'too close to home' and ongoing distractions. Ingle confirmed the statement to Boxing News. Lemieux admitted to passing on the opportunity to fight Saunders because he was pursuing a bigger money fight, possibly with Miguel Cotto.

Warren announced on 6 July, that a deal was in place for Saunders to defend his title against former world title challenger Willie Monroe Jr. (21-2, 6 KOs) at the Copper Box Arena in London  on 16 September 2017. Monroe was coming off a unanimous decision win against Gabe Rosado on 17 September 2016. At the press conference, Warren said the winner would highly likely be in a position to fight the winner of Golovkin and Álvarez. Monroe was said to be excited fighting outside of the US for the first time in his career. Throughout the promotion, Saunders had tried to get the better of Monroe. This continued at the official weigh in. As Saunders stood on the scale, his 7-year-old son, Stevie Saunders, also took to stage. Monroe patted Stevie on the head, to which he reacted by punching and kicking Monroe to the groin. Banner Promotions Vice-President, Matt Rowland felt disheartened to Saunders 'non-reaction'. Monroe also had no immediate reaction to being hit on the groin. Monroe later reacted stating that he intended to sue unless he was compensated. Saunders defeated Monroe via unanimous decision 117–111, 115–114, and 117–112 on the cards respectively. Saunders controlled the fight throughout, suffering a cut over his right eye during a clash of heads in round 4. Monroe did not pose much threat and lack of knockout power, saw him on the backfoot, pot-shotting and using his jab frequently. In the post-fight, Saunders thanked Monroe for coming over to the UK for the fight, while his son apologized for hitting him in the groin. Warren stated that Saunders would likely fight again in December 2017.

Saunders vs. Lemieux
Although the Golovkin vs. Canelo fight ended in a split draw, Saunders still pursued a unification fight next. After weeks of going back and forth with former IBF champion David Lemieux (38-3, 33 KOs) on Twitter, on 10 October, the WBO ordered them to meet in a mandatory fight with both camps having 30 days to negotiate a fight, which would likely take place early in 2018. On 16 October, Lemieux's manager Camille Estephan stated the negotiations were going well for the fight and could possibly take place at the Bell Centre in Canada on 16 December 2017. He also stated that HBO were interested showcasing the fight. On 17 October, WBO confirmed the fight had been signed to take place at the new Place Bell in Laval, Quebec. Saunders won the bout, retaining his WBO title for the third time. The judges scored the fight 120–108, 117–111, and 118–110. Both HBO and ESPN scored it a clear 120–108 for Saunders. In the post-fight, Saunders called out Golovkin, "Golovkin, you keep saying you want my WBO belt. Fight me now. You'll be punching fresh air." CompuBox showed that Saunders landed 165 of 430 punches (38%) and Lemieux landed 67 of his 356 thrown (19%). Saunders earned a minimum $1 million purse while Lemieux took home a $500,000 guaranteed purse. The fight, which marked Saunders's first appearance on HBO, averaged 716,000 viewers, peaking at 775,000 viewers.

Inactivity 
On 17 January 2018, Warren announced that Saunders would make a fourth defence of his WBO title at The O2 Arena in London, on the same card Terry Flanagan fights Maurice Hooker for the vacant WBO junior-lightweight title on 14 April. The bout would be a 'stay busy' fight for Saunders whilst Golovkin and Álvarez negotiate a rematch for May 2018. A few names listed as Saunders' potential opponents were Martin Murray, Conrad Cummings, Rafael Bejaran and Jason Quigley. Two days later, it was confirmed that 4-time world title challenger Murray (36-4-1, 17 KOs) would be Saunders next opponent, with the fight being billed as 'Battle of Britain' on BT Sport. On 20 March, Saunders suffered a hand injury in training forcing the card to be cancelled, however the fight was quickly rescheduled for 23 June 2018 at the same arena. On 3 June, Murray announced via his Instagram page that Saunders' had once again pulled out of the fight citing a hamstring injury. Saunders later tweeted, "You have your ups in boxing, but last three months have been downs, sorry to Martin and the fans, be back soon." Murray was not convinced about the injury as he stated Saunders had long been after a big money fight with either Canelo Álvarez or Gennady Golovkin.

On 20 June, it was reported that Saunders would fight in September 2018. The then-IBF super-middleweight champion James DeGale was rumoured to be his opponent, possibly at 168 pounds. On 12 July, the WBO ordered Saunders to make a mandatory defence against former two-time light-middleweight champion Demetrius Andrade  (25-0, 16 KOs), with both sides having 10 days to reach a deal. On 13 July, it was reported that Andrade would be unveiled as one of Eddie Hearn's Matchroom Boxing USA's signing with a deal that would see him fighting on DAZN. On 17 July, at the official launch, Andrade was introduced as one of Matchroom Boxing USA's signings. On 25 July, the purse bid, which was scheduled for the evening, was cancelled after it was revealed that Eddie Hearn and Frank Warren had reached a deal for the fight to take place in USA under the Matchroom USA banner on DAZN. It was said that representatives of Top Rank were scheduled to be present at the purse bid to try and secure the fight for ESPN+. With Matchroom USA having promotional rights on the fight, Warren confirmed the fight would take place on Sky Sports in the United Kingdom and not BT Sport. On 9 August, according to Hearn, the fight would take place at the TD Garden in Boston, Massachusetts on 20 October.

On 27 September, ESPN's Dan Rafael first reported that Saunders had tested positive for oxilofrine, known as a stimulant. The test was carried out by the Voluntary Anti-Doping Association (VADA) on 30 August. VADA president Dr. Margaret Goodman reported, "The results of the analysis are as follows: Adverse. Urine specimen number 4248408: oxilofrine detected. Note the following is also contained on the laboratory report: 'Opinions: oxilofrine may have resulted from the administration of ephedrine which was also detected but below the decision limit of 11ug/ml. The estimated concentration of ephedrine is 4.6 ug/ml." Hearn stated he would wait to see if the Massachusetts commission will allow Saunders to fight, however confirmed Andrade would still appear in the main event, whether it be a vacant world title or a non-title bout. Promoter Warren claimed the positive test was due to a nasal spray and was permitted by UKAD. The BBBofC also stated Saunders was not in breach of their regulations. At a hearing, the MSAC denied Saunders a license, meaning he could not defend his title against Andrade. According to reports, the cancellation meant Saunders team would be losing around $2.3 million. WBO president, Paco Valcarcel told ESPN, Saunders would not be stripped immediately, as Saunders would likely appeal and Andrade's fight against Namibian boxer Walter Kautondokwa (17-0, 16 KOs), who at the time was ranked #2 with the WBO, would be for the vacant WBO interim title. On 11 October 2018, it was announced that Saunders had vacated the WBO middleweight title in anticipation of being stripped.

Ring return 
On 12 December 2018, promoter Warren announced that Saunders would return to the ring on 22 December at the Manchester Arena on the Josh Warrington vs. Carl Frampton IBF featherweight championship undercard. It was later announced his opponent would be Hungarian boxer Zoltan Sera (32-17-1, 22 KOs). Sera was replaced days before the fight. Saunders' new opponent was revealed to be 41 year old veteran Charles Adamu (32-13, 25 KOs) from Ghana. Saunders weighed 178.5 pounds and Adamu came in at 173.2 pounds. Saunders won the fight after Adamu failed to come out from his corner after round four.

Super-middleweight

Saunders vs. Isufi 
On 22 January 2019, the WBO lifted Saunders' six month suspension and ordered Andrade vs. Saunders for the WBO title. On 18 February, Warren announced that Saunders would be moving up in weight and challenging for the vacant WBO super-middleweight title at the SSE Arena in London on 13 April. His opponent was scheduled to be German based Albanian Shefat Isufi. A week later, Gilberto Ramírez stated although he was scheduled to fight at the light heavyweight limit for his next bout, he had not vacated his super-middleweight title. There would be a chance he could return to the super-middleweight division. Upon hearing this, Saunders admitted his fight was now in jeopardy and was not sure he would fight Isufi, if the WBO title was not at stake.

On 12 March, it was reported that MTK Global had signed a deal with ESPN for them to broadcast 30 events a year. It was said that with this deal, Saunders' would be co-promoted by Top Rank. It was rumoured around the same time that Saunders' had split with trainer Dom Ingle and may be trained solely by Ben Davison. On 25 March, at a press conference, Saunders vs. Isufi (27-3-2, 20 KOs) was announced to take place for the interim WBO super-middleweight title on 18 May at Stevenage's Lamex Stadium. Warren believed the stadium would pack in around 15,000 fans seated on the stands and on the pitch. Saunders advised if he is victorious, he would likely challenge Ramírez for the full title in late 2019, however if Ramírez opted to remain at light-heavyweight, the winner of Saunders vs. Isufi would become full champion. Coming into the bout, Isufi was on a 10-fight win streak. The fight would air on BT Sport in the UK and streamed live on ESPN+ in the United States. On 25 March, Saunders confirmed he would be training with Ben Davison full-time. On 13 May, Ramírez officially vacated the WBO title, making Saunders vs. Isufi for the full world title. Saunders came in at the 168-pound limit and Isufi came in slightly lighter at 167.4 pounds. Saunders won the fight by a landslide unanimous decision, winning the WBO super-middleweight title and becoming a two weight world champion.

Saunders vs. Coceres 

In September 2019, it was announced that Saunders would make the first defence of his WBO super-middleweight title on the KSI vs. Logan Paul II undercard. On 9 October 2019, it was confirmed that Saunders would be fighting Marcelo Esteban Coceres on 9 November. Coceres gave Saunders a tough fight through the first ten rounds, but in the eleventh, Saunders knocked Coceres down three times, prompting referee Ray Corona to wave the fight off 1 minute 59 seconds into the penultimate round, securing the victory and successfully defending his WBO title.

Saunders vs. Murray 
On 4 December 2020, Saunders returned to the ring after more than a year out of the ring to make the second defence of his WBO title against Martin Murray in the SSE Arena, London. Saunders dominated his opponent with a convincing lopsided unanimous decision victory, with the judges' scorecards reading 120–109, 120–109, 118–110 in his favour.

Saunders vs. Álvarez 

On 28 February 2020, Canelo Álvarez's trainer Eddy Reynoso confirmed Saunders as the next opponent for the Mexican on 2 May, with a contract still to be finalised. Both undefeated super-middleweight champions Saunders and Callum Smith had both turned down offers to fight Álvarez, hoping to bargain for a better purse to fight the pound-for-pound star.

The fight was set to mark DAZN's global launch in Latin America (including Mexico), UK, and 189 other countries after previously being launched in nine countries. The bout was postponed due to the spread of the Coronavirus disease, while Canelo's team floated the possibility of a Golovkin trilogy late in 2020 that might conflict with the Saunders fight.

After Álvarez's successful title defence against Avni Yıldırım on 27 February 2021, Eddie Hearn, the promoter of both Saunders and Álvarez, confirmed a unification bout on 8 May 2021 for Saunders' WBO title, and Álvarez's WBA (Super), WBC and The Ring titles.

With 73,126 fans in attendance at AT&T Stadium in Arlington, Texas, a record amount for an indoor boxing event in the US, Saunders was hit with an uppercut towards the end of the eighth round, causing immediate swelling to his right eye. Saunders had boxed well to this point, generally being able to avoid Canelo's bigger shots. While sat on his stool at the end of the round, he informed his trainer Mark Tibbs that he could not see, prompting Tibbs to call a halt to the contest, handing Saunders the first defeat of his career. At the time of the stoppage, Saunders was behind on the judges' scorecards with 78–74 (twice) and 77–75. Hearn revealed after the fight that Saunders had suffered multiple fractures to his eye socket and was awaiting surgery.

Controversies
In September 2018, a then-29-year-old Saunders was caught on camera pretending to be a police officer and forcing a man to strip naked in his car. Saunders can be heard telling the driver to remove his shirt, trousers and the rest of his clothes because he thought he “had a weapon.” 

A video of Saunders in his Rolls-Royce taunting a drug addict, offering £150 of crack cocaine to perform a sex act or punch a passer-by, was released on 17 September 2018. The woman punched a man walking past and Saunders then drove away from the scene. A second video then surfaced of him calling another woman "a prostitute", and stating "we don’t wanna get the clap off you". The General Secretary of the British Boxing Board of Control (BBBofC), Robert Smith, responded: "I have just seen the videos and I can tell you we find it disgusting. I am speaking to members of the board now. I am keen to get on with this as soon as possible." The incidents were investigated. The BBBofC found Saunders "guilty of bringing the sport into disrepute'", issued him a severe reprimand, and fined him £100,000.

In March 2020, Saunders was alleged to have made a phone call to Delta Airlines claiming that three other boxers on a flight from Las Vegas to New York were infected with COVID-19. The call resulted in the trio's removal from the flight. An audio clip of the call circulated on social media in which Saunders was heard laughing about the incident. Later in March, Saunders posted an online video instructing men how to hit their female partners whilst in isolation due to the coronavirus pandemic. In the video Saunders uses a punch bag to explain how to react if "your old woman is giving you mouth" and showing how to "hit her on the chin". He later posted a follow-up video stating the video was intended as a joke, apologised for any offence caused, and stated he would donate £25,000 to a domestic violence charity. Due to the video, Saunders's boxing licence was suspended by the BBBofC pending investigation. In July 2020, the BBBofC found him guilty of misconduct and fined him £15,000. His suspension was then lifted.

On November 28, 2021, a video surfaced online via YouTube of a man claiming that Saunders stabbed his 18-year-old son in the hand after a street fight. The man also alleges that Saunders pulled out a gun and pointed it at his other son, but hesitated to fire it. Saunders released a statement days later via his Instagram account, labelling the accusations as "complete rubbish" while also saying that he would "make no public comment at this stage" acting on the advice of his lawyer.

Saunders has also received attention for his links to reputed Irish crime boss Daniel Kinahan, who served as Saunders's advisor. Saunders has publicly criticised the British and Irish media for their coverage of Kinahan, releasing numerous statements in his defence.

Personal life
Saunders is a father of two sons, both born to his former girlfriend Ruby. He is a friend of heavyweight champion Tyson Fury.

Professional boxing record

References

External links

Billy Joe Saunders profile at Frank Warren Promotions
Billy Joe Saunders on Time's list of "100 Olympic Athletes to Watch"
  Twitter

World super-middleweight boxing champions
English Romani people
English male boxers
Romani sportspeople
Boxers at the 2008 Summer Olympics
Olympic boxers of Great Britain
1989 births
Living people
World Boxing Organization champions
European Boxing Union champions
Commonwealth Boxing Council champions
World middleweight boxing champions
Welterweight boxers
British Boxing Board of Control champions
English sportspeople in doping cases